Events from the year 1949 in Belgium

Incumbents
Monarch: Leopold III, with Prince Charles as regent
Prime Minister: 
 Paul-Henri Spaak (to 11 August)
 Gaston Eyskens (from 11 August)

Events
 4 April – Paul-Henri Spaak signs the North Atlantic Treaty in Washington, D.C.
 26 June – 1949 Belgian general election

Publications
 Léon Kochnitzky, Adolphe Sax and his Saxophone (New York, Belgian Govt. Information Center)
 Charles Leirens, Belgian Music (New York, Belgian Govt. Information Center)

Births
 24 March – Richard Biefnot, politician (died 2020)
 21 November – Willy Vande Walle, Japanologist

Deaths
 15 January – Lou Tseng-Tsiang (born 1871), diplomat, politician and monk

References

 
Belgium
Years of the 20th century in Belgium
1940s in Belgium
Belgium